"The Jeffersons" is the sixth episode in the eighth season of the American animated television series South Park. It is seventh in production order. The 117th episode of the series overall, it was originally broadcast on Comedy Central in the United States on April 21, 2004.

In the episode, Michael Jackson, under the fake name of Martin Jefferson, moves to South Park to escape his popularity.

Plot 
Stan, Kyle, Cartman and Kenny notice that someone new has moved into the Donovans' former residence. A little boy named Blanket tells them they moved to South Park to escape city life. They find the house is filled with toys and games, and the backyard is a funfair. They meet Blanket's father, Mr. Jefferson, a wealthy, eccentric, effeminate, pale-skinned man-child (obviously Michael Jackson wearing a fake moustache, though everyone remains oblivious). Kyle notices Mr. Jefferson is neglecting Blanket.

Stan tells his parents about the Jeffersons and Sharon invites them over to a dinner party. The adults try to talk with Mr. Jefferson at the dinner, but he is more shy around adults than children. Cartman becomes jealous that they are having Mr. Jefferson over without him. That night at Stan's house, Stan is woken by Mr. Jefferson dressed as Peter Pan, who wants to play. Cartman comes through the window to prevent Stan from having Mr. Jefferson all to himself. Kyle shows up at the door with Blanket who he found alone in his backyard. Mr. Jefferson suggests a sleepover between the boys.

The next morning, Stan's parents walk in to see Mr. Jefferson in Stan's bed and scold Mr. Jefferson about how inappropriate it is for a man to sleep in bed with someone else’s children. Mr. Jefferson explains that his behaviour is from not having a childhood due to working constantly as a boy, and gives Randy and Sharon $100 each to drop the matter. After Mr. Jefferson and Blanket leave, Sharon forbids the boys to see Mr. Jefferson; everyone agrees except Cartman.

At the Park County Police Station, Harrison Yates gets a report about the Jeffersons that says they are wealthy and black, and the whole department sets off to frame him for a crime as they express their disdain for African Americans wealthier than them. They plant cocaine, pubic hair, and blood in Mr. Jefferson's home and wait for him to arrive. When the officers see Mr. Jefferson, they abort the operation, sick with themselves that they had almost put an innocent white man in jail. Yates returns home planning on retiring the force, but his wife encourages him that "framing wealthy black people is in his blood". He agrees, and calls the police department in Santa Barbara, Mr. Jefferson's former place of residence. They alert him that they framed a rich black man charged of molestation who did not look black, and he ran away before trial.

Mr. Jefferson refuses to let Blanket outside anymore because he thinks everyone is against them. Stan and Kyle fear for the safety of Blanket after seeing Mr. Jefferson dangle him from the balcony of his house. They decide to rescue Blanket by sneaking into his room at night and switching him with Kenny. Mr. Jefferson calls his plastic surgeon in California to see if he can put his face back together, which is falling apart from years of plastic surgery. Stan and Kyle try to smuggle Blanket out of the house but are confronted by a horribly disfigured Mr. Jefferson, who wants them to play, and they escape to Blanket's room. Upon seeing Kenny dressed like Blanket, Mr. Jefferson playfully throws him too high, killing him. He chases the other three outside where the police are waiting to arrest him for the molestation charges put in Santa Barbara.

A crowd gathers around. Cartman defends Mr. Jefferson, saying he never had a proper childhood, which was why he associated more with children. Kyle counters that even if all of the accusations about Mr. Jefferson are false and the police really do go around framing rich black men, that he has to grow up because he has a child of his own now. Mr. Jefferson decides to be more of a father to Blanket and give away their wealth to the needy, which no longer gives a reason for the police to arrest him; Yates tells Mr. Jefferson that there was "no point in putting another poor black man in jail".

Reception
Maxim states Mr. Jefferson is "a Michael Jackson-like freak", and National Board of Review's John Gallagher calls this episode "a howlingly funny assault on Michael Jackson" in his review of the DVD. The A.V. Club would later call it "one of [the] best [Harrison] Yates episodes ever".

References

External links
 "The Jeffersons" Full episode at South Park Studios
 

Cultural depictions of Michael Jackson
O. J. Simpson murder case
South Park (season 8) episodes